is a former Japanese football player.

Playing career
Sugiyama was born in Kasukabe on July 25, 1980. He joined J1 League club Kashiwa Reysol from youth team in 1999. However he could hardly play in the match until 2002. In 2003, he moved to J2 League club Ventforet Kofu. He played many matches as right side back for a long time. From 2005, he completely became a regular player and the club was promoted to J1 from 2006. However the club was relegated to J2 from 2008. In 2010, he moved to J1 club Omiya Ardija based in his local Saitama Prefecture. He played many matches as right side back in 2 seasons. In 2012, he moved to J2 club Yokohama FC. In 2013, he moved to J2 club FC Gifu. Although he played many matches as regular player in 2013, he could hardly play in the match in 2014 and retired end of 2014 season.

Club statistics

References

External links

1980 births
Living people
Association football people from Saitama Prefecture
Japanese footballers
J1 League players
J2 League players
Kashiwa Reysol players
Ventforet Kofu players
Omiya Ardija players
Yokohama FC players
FC Gifu players
Association football defenders